Alphonso Colby Smith (March 4, 1894 – June 2, 1945) was a Canadian politician. He served in the Legislative Assembly of New Brunswick as member of the Progressive Conservative party from 1939 to 1945.

References

1894 births
1945 deaths
Progressive Conservative Party of New Brunswick MLAs
Politicians from Saint John, New Brunswick